Paul Raffi Abrahamian is an American reality television personality and clothing designer, born in Tarzana, California. Abrahamian is best known for their appearances in the United States reality television show Big Brother and related spin-offs.

Early life and education
Abrahamian was born in Tarzana, Los Angeles, in the U.S. state of California. They are of Armenian and Russian descent. Abrahamian attended Pepperdine University and received a degree in philosophy.

Big Brother
From 2016 to 2018, Abrahamian appeared in five consecutive seasons of Big Brother, three times in the parent series and three times in spin-offs. Abrahamian is the first HouseGuest to have twice reached the final two of the competition without winning. 

Abrahamian was first introduced as a new HouseGuest on Big Brother 18 on June 19, 2016. Throughout their game play, Abrahamian was nominated for eviction six times. However, on three of those occasions they were removed from the block via the Power of Veto, which they won three times. They also won Head of Household three times during the season, including the final HoH when they chose to take Nicole Franzel to the finale.

On June 28, 2017, Abrahamian returned to Big Brother in Big Brother 19 as a swap-in contestant on the first day, resulting from a temptation accepted by another HouseGuest. Abrahamian's return to the game was met with both positive and negative reviews from critics. Throughout the season Abrahamian was only nominated for eviction once which was immediately canceled via The Pendant of Protection. They were unanimously elected by their fellow HouseGuests to face Cody in the season's 'Battle Back'. During the season they won the title of Head of Household three times and was awarded the Power of Veto five times. They also won the first round of the final Head of Household competition but lost to Josh in the final round.

In October 18, 2016, it was announced that Abrahamian was set to return to the house in the subscription-streaming spin-off Big Brother: Over the Top, to host a Head of Household competition. Abrahamian returned to the house on October 21 to host the fourth Head of Household competition of the season. Abrahamian appeared in the series premiere of the Big Brother spin-off Celebrity Big Brother for a special appearance during the first Head of Household competition. On June 27, 2018, Abrahamian appeared in the audience for the premiere episode of Big Brother 20 as a "nod to the shows past". They appeared on Off the Block with Ross and Marissa, a Big Brother talk and aftershow, on August 24, 2018. Abrahamian appeared in the thirty-third episode of Big Brother 20 to celebrate the engagement of Nicole Franzel and Victor Arroyo.

Outside of Big Brother
On October 25, 2016, Abrahamian appeared on the CBS show The Bold & The Beautiful. On July 9, 2017, Abrahamian teamed up with former Big Brother contestant Da'Vonne Rogers in the series premiere of the CBS game show Candy Crush as part of a special premiere event featuring past players of Big Brother and Survivor.

Personal life
Abrahamian uses both 'they/them' and 'he/him' pronouns interchangeably.

Filmography

Notes

References

1993 births
American fashion designers
American people of Armenian descent
American people of Russian descent
Big Brother (American TV series) contestants
Living people
People from Tarzana, Los Angeles